Zhao Yiman (1905 – 2 August 1936) was a female Chinese resistance fighter against the Imperial Japanese Army in Northeast China, which was under the occupation of the Japanese puppet state Manchukuo. She was captured in 1935 by Japanese forces and executed in 1936. She is considered a national hero in China, and an eponymous biopic was made for her in 1950. The 2005 film My Mother Zhao Yiman was based on her son's memory of her.

Biography

Zhao was born Li Kuntai (李坤泰) to a rich family of Sichuan Province in October 1905.

She joined the Communist Party of China in 1926. In September 1927, she went to the Soviet Union to study at the Moscow Sun Yat-sen University. She married her comrade Chen Dabang (陈达邦). She returned to China in the winter of 1928, and engaged in the underground Communist work in Shanghai, and then in Jiangxi Province.

After the Mukden Incident, she was sent to northeast China to start up struggles against the Japanese occupation. She changed her name as Zhao Yiman to avoid implicating her family.

In November 1935, the Imperial Japanese Army and the Manchukuo troops encircled the 2nd Regiment of the 3rd Army of the Northeast Anti-Japanese United Army. Zhao Yiman, who was political commissar of the regiment, was seriously wounded. Several days later, the Japanese found Zhao in a farmhouse where she stayed. In the ensuing fighting, she was wounded again and captured.

Imprisonment 
Zhao was cruelly tortured after an argument with the questioners. In view of her political value, the Japanese sent her to a hospital to receive treatment. In the hospital, Zhao converted and recruited Han Yongyi, a female nurse, and Dong Xianxun, a guard. Han and Dong helped her to escape. Zhao was recaptured not far from the guerrilla base and suffered further torture due to her escape.

On 2 August 1936, she wrote down the last words, asking her children to continue the struggle. On her way to the execution ground, Zhao sang loudly the Ode of the Red Flag, and shouted anti-Japanese slogans.

The guard, Dong, who helped Zhao to escape, soon died in the prison after torture.

Memorial 

Zhao Yiman is featured as one of the revolutionary heroes in the Northeast China Revolutionary Martyrs Memorial Hall located at 241 Yiman Street in the Nangang district of Harbin.

References

Women in war in China
Military personnel of the Republic of China killed in the Second Sino-Japanese War
1905 births
1936 deaths
Moscow Sun Yat-sen University alumni
Chinese expatriates in the Soviet Union
Women in World War II
People executed by Japanese occupation forces
Executed people from Sichuan
People from Yibin
Executed Chinese women
Chinese communists
People of Manchukuo
Chinese prisoners of war
Prisoners of war held by Japan